WTAI may refer to:

 WTAI (FM), a radio station (88.9 FM) licensed to Union City, Tennessee, United States
 WLZR, a radio station (1560 AM) originally licensed in Eau Gallie, Florida, United States which held the call sign WTAI from 1968 to 1997.
 Wireless Telephony Applications Interface in the List of telephony terminology
 A collection of telephony specific extensions for call and feature control mechanism that make advanced mobile network services available to users 
 Where the Action Is television show